Sotirios Tsergas (born ) is a Greek male volleyball player. He was part of the Greece men's national volleyball team. On club level he played for Olympiacos and Panellinios.

References

External links
 profile at FIVB.org

1978 births
Living people
Greek men's volleyball players
Olympiacos S.C. players
Place of birth missing (living people)
PAOK V.C. players